The Prison Without Walls is a 1917 American drama silent film directed by E. Mason Hopper and written by Beulah Marie Dix and Robert E. MacAlarney. The film stars Wallace Reid, Myrtle Stedman, William Conklin, William Elmer, Marcia Manon and James Neill. The film was released on March 15, 1917, by Paramount Pictures.

Plot

Cast 
Wallace Reid as Huntington Babbs
Myrtle Stedman as Helen Ainsworth
William Conklin as Norman Morris
William Elmer as Horse Gilligan
Marcia Manon as Felice Rossa 
James Neill as John Havens
Lillian Leighton 	
Clarence Geldart

References

External links 
 

1917 films
1910s English-language films
Silent American drama films
1917 drama films
Paramount Pictures films
Films directed by E. Mason Hopper
American black-and-white films
American silent feature films
1910s American films